The enzyme monomethyl-sulfatase (EC 3.1.6.16) catalyzes the reaction 

monomethyl sulfate + H2O  methanol + sulfate

This enzyme belongs to the family of hydrolases, specifically those acting on sulfuric ester bonds.  The systematic name is monomethyl-sulfate sulfohydrolase.

References

EC 3.1.6
Enzymes of unknown structure